Aleksandr Ermakov may refer to:
 Aleksandr Yermakov, Russian footballer
 Aleksandr Ermakov (handballer), Russian handball player